The 1971 Colorado Buffaloes football team represented the University of Colorado at Boulder in the Big Eight Conference during the 1971 NCAA University Division football season. Led by ninth-year head coach Eddie Crowder, the Buffaloes were 9–2 in the regular season (5–2 in Big 8, third), and played their home games on campus at Folsom Field in Boulder, Colorado.

Invited to the Astro-Bluebonnet Bowl against host Houston, seventh-ranked Colorado defeated the #15 Cougars 29–17 to finish at 10–2, outscoring their opponents 320–220. The Buffs climbed to third in the final AP poll, behind Nebraska and Oklahoma, also of the Big Eight (and their only two losses, both on the road).

Colorado's next bowl win came nineteen years later. This was the first season of artificial turf at Folsom Field; natural grass returned 28 years later in 1999.

In his only season in Boulder, Jerry Claiborne was the defensive coordinator, previously the head coach for a decade at Virginia Tech. He left to become head coach at Maryland for a decade, then at his alma mater Kentucky for eight years.

Schedule

Roster

Season summary

Ohio State

Oklahoma State
Charles Davis 342 rush yards (conference record)

NFL draft
Two Buffaloes were selected in the 1972 NFL Draft

References

External links
University of Colorado Athletics – 1971 football roster
Sports Reference – 1971 Colorado football season

Colorado
Colorado Buffaloes football seasons
Bluebonnet Bowl champion seasons
Colorado Buffaloes football